How Images Think is a book about new media by Ron Burnett published by MIT Press in 2004.

References

New media
MIT Press books
2004 non-fiction books